Thomas Joyce may refer to

Thomas Athol Joyce (1878–1942), British anthropologist
Joyce Cary (1888–1957), Anglo-Irish novelist who used the pen-name of Thomas Joyce in his early career